Yandian may refer to the following locations in China:

 Yandian, Hubei, a town in Anlu, Xiaogan, Hubei
 Yandian, Linqing (烟店镇), a town in Shandong
 Yandian, Shen County (燕店镇), a town in Shandong
 Yandian, Yanzhou (颜店镇), a town in Shandong
 Yandian Township, Anhui (严店乡), in Feixi County
 Yandian Township, Liaoning (阎店乡), in Wafangdian
 Yandian, Wulipu (严店村), a village in Wulipu, Shayang, Jingmen, Hubei
 Yandian, Yandian, a village in Yandian, Anlu, Xiaogan, Hubei